The Penzhin Tidal Power Plant Project is a set of proposals for construction of a tidal power plant in the Penzhin Bay, which is an upper right arm of Shelikhov Bay in the north-east corner of the Sea of Okhotsk. Because Penzhin Bay has one of the strongest tides in the world, there have been several power station proposals. One proposed variant presumes an installed capacity of 87 GW and annual production of 200 TWh.

Geographically, the dam of the power station would extend through the administrative border of Magadan Oblast and Kamchatka Krai of Russia.

General information 
As the area of the bay basin is 20,530 km2 (7,930 mi2), it corresponds to diurnal discharge of 360–530 km3 (86–130 cu mi). This water rate is 20–30 times higher than that of the world's biggest river, the Amazon River. Two projects were developed for tidal power stations. The first would use the entire basin of the bay. The second proposes a smaller-scale plant, using the northern part of the basin with higher tides:

Due to the lack of existing local energy consumers or long-distance power distribution infrastructure, there are suggestions for the station to provide power-consuming production. One such consumer, for example, would be the production of liquid hydrogen.

Hydrological potential of the bay 

The tides in Shelikhov Bay are of the diurnal type. The area of Penzhin Bay basin is 20,530 km2.

The passing stream has its own potential energy, which in the gravity field of Earth is above zero only in the case of non-zero head of water and can be expressed as follows:
,   (1)
where  denotes potential energy;  — density of sea water, equal to 1,027 kg/m3;  — area of basin;  — height of the tide and  — gravitational acceleration, set to 9.81 m/s2. The part of the expression in brackets denotes terms defining the mass of water passing through the basin daily.

As can be seen in formula (1), the potential energy becomes zero in the case of zero head of water and in the case of equal heights of head and tide. If considering this formula as a function of head level, it has a form of parabolic dependence, with its maximum at  = 2• or at  m. This value of  gives two times lower height of tide in the bay and twice smaller average discharge of water — 5 m and  (205.3 km3/day), correspondingly.

The substitution of obtained parameters into (1) and dividing it by the day length in seconds gives the average capacity 120 GW. The latter one yields 1,054 TW•h or 3.79 Joules of energy annually. Depending on the efficiency of conversion of potential energy into electricity, the total quantity of electricity and electric capacity will have somewhat lower values. If one assumes an efficiency of conversion of 96%, this gives an average electric capacity of 115 GW and an available amount of electricity of 1,012 TW•h or 3.64 J per year.

See also 

 Tidal power

References 

Proposed tidal power stations
Proposed renewable energy power stations in Russia
Tidal power stations in Russia
Sea of Okhotsk